Alder Brook is a  long tributary to West Branch French Creek that is classed as a 1st order stream on the EPA waters geoviewer site.

Course
Alder Brook rises in Venango Township of eastern Erie County, Pennsylvania and then flows east to meet West Branch French Creek north of Lowville.

Watershed
Alder Brook drains  of Erie Drift Plain (glacial geology).  The watershed receives an average of 46.2 in/year of precipitation and has a wetness index of 473.57.  The watershed is about 41% forested.

References

Rivers of Pennsylvania
Tributaries of the Allegheny River
Rivers of Erie County, Pennsylvania